Fuchsia denticulata is a small shrub or vine in the family Onagraceae, native to Bolivia and Peru.

References

apetala
Flora of Bolivia
Flora of Peru